The Columbus Division of Fire (CFD) provides fire protection and emergency medical services to Columbus, Ohio.

The department operates 35 stations; the newest station opened March 2020. The stations are divided into seven battalions. The Columbus Division of Fire oversees 35 engine companies, 16 ladder companies, 5 rescue companies, and 40 EMS transport vehicles as well as several special units and reserve apparatus. It is staffed by a minimum of 292 personnel during daytime hours (first 12 hours) and 331 during nighttime hours (second 12 hours). The department also oversees 39 medic companies. There are 1,592 uniformed and 70 civilian professionals serving the citizens of Columbus, Ohio.

The department is accredited by the Committee on Fire Accreditation International, granted in 2007. At the time, it was the second-largest fire department with the accreditation.

The Division of Fire was created in 1822, and was known as the Columbus Fire Department.

Notable stations

In use
 Station 10, built in 2008
 Station 19, built in 1931

Out of use
Columbus has numerous historic fire station buildings that are still extant, repurposed for other uses. Stations built in the 1890s include:
 Engine House No. 5, built in 1894
 Engine House No. 6, built in 1982
 Engine House No. 7, built in 1894
 Engine House No. 8 (at 283 N. 20th St.)
 Engine House No. 10, built in 1897
 Engine House No. 11, built in 1896 (at 1000 E. Main St.)
 Engine House No. 12, built in 1896

Other former stations include:
 Engine House No. 14 (at 1716 Parsons Ave.)
 Engine House No. 16, built in 1908 (today the Central Ohio Fire Museum)
 Engine House No. 17 (at 2300 W. Broad St.)
 Engine House No. 18, built in 1926 (at 1551 Cleveland Ave.)

See also 

 Government of Columbus, Ohio
 Station 67, headquarters for Columbus Firefighters Local 67

References

External links 

 

1822 establishments in Ohio
Ambulance services in the United States
Government of Columbus, Ohio
Emergency services in Ohio
Fire departments in Ohio
Medical and health organizations based in Ohio